The Swedish Society of Actuaries is the association of actuaries in Sweden. The Society was founded on 3 March 1904. It is a full member of the International Actuarial Association and the Groupe Consultatif. As of 2004, the Society has about 290 members.

External links
 Swedish Society of Actuaries official website

Actuarial associations